Henri Anger (8 June 1907 – 1989) was a French journalist and writer. Entered at Télégramme de Brest et de l'Ouest in 1944, he became its chief editor in 1965. He used to sign his columns under the pseudonym Kerdaniel.

After he finished his studies at lycée de Nantes, he became a journalist at age 16 for Le Populaire de Nantes.

Henri Anger won the 1983 edition of the Prix Roland de Jouvenel awarded by the Académie française with his novel Une petite fille en colère as well as the 1988 edition of the Prix des Deux Magots with his novel La Mille-et-Unième Rue.

Works 
1979: Chatte allaitant un ourson, Grasset
1980: L'An Quarante, Grasset
1982: Une Petite fille en colère, Gallimard
1987: La Mille-et-Unième Rue, Julliard, Prix des Deux Magots 
1989: Monte-Carlo blues, Julliard

References

External links 
 Chatte allaitant un ourson (presentation) on Grasset
 Henri Auger on the site of the Académie française

1907 births
People from Loire-Atlantique
1989 deaths
Writers from Brittany
20th-century French journalists
20th-century French writers
20th-century French male writers
French male non-fiction writers